Archandrodesmus kandyanus, is a species of millipedes in the family Pyrgodesmidae. It is endemic to Sri Lanka.

References

Polydesmida
Animals described in 1932
Endemic fauna of Sri Lanka
Millipedes of Asia